The canton of Sermaize-les-Bains is an administrative division of the Marne department, northeastern France. It was created at the French canton reorganisation which came into effect in March 2015. Its seat is in Sermaize-les-Bains.

It consists of the following communes:
 
Alliancelles
Ambrières
Arrigny
Bassu
Bassuet
Bettancourt-la-Longue
Bignicourt-sur-Saulx
Blesme
Brandonvillers
Brusson
Le Buisson
Bussy-le-Repos
Changy
Charmont
Châtillon-sur-Broué
Cheminon
Cloyes-sur-Marne
Dompremy
Drosnay
Écollemont
Écriennes
Étrepy
Favresse
Giffaumont-Champaubert
Gigny-Bussy
Haussignémont
Hauteville
Heiltz-l'Évêque
Heiltz-le-Hutier
Heiltz-le-Maurupt
Isle-sur-Marne
Jussecourt-Minecourt
Landricourt
Larzicourt
Lisse-en-Champagne
Luxémont-et-Villotte
Matignicourt-Goncourt
Maurupt-le-Montois
Merlaut
Moncetz-l'Abbaye
Norrois
Orconte
Outines
Outrepont
Pargny-sur-Saulx
Plichancourt
Ponthion
Possesse
Reims-la-Brûlée
Saint-Amand-sur-Fion
Sainte-Marie-du-Lac-Nuisement
Saint-Eulien
Saint-Jean-devant-Possesse
Saint-Lumier-en-Champagne
Saint-Lumier-la-Populeuse
Saint-Quentin-les-Marais
Saint-Remy-en-Bouzemont-Saint-Genest-et-Isson
Saint-Vrain
Sapignicourt
Scrupt
Sermaize-les-Bains
Sogny-en-l'Angle
Thiéblemont-Farémont
Trois-Fontaines-l'Abbaye
Val-de-Vière
Vanault-le-Châtel
Vanault-les-Dames
Vauclerc
Vavray-le-Grand
Vavray-le-Petit
Vernancourt
Villers-le-Sec
Vitry-en-Perthois
Vouillers
Vroil

References

Cantons of Marne (department)